The École européenne d'ingénieurs en génie des matériaux (EEIGM) is a French engineering College created in 1991.

The EEIGM trains 90 engineers in materials engineering every year. To do this, all students study the main families of materials, which are metals and alloys, polymers, ceramics and composites.

Located in Nancy, the EEIGM is a public higher education institution. The school is a member of the University of Lorraine and the National Polytechnic Institute of Lorraine.

Notable alumni 
 Matthias Maurer, German European Space Agency astronaut and materials scientist

References

External links
 EEIGM

Engineering universities and colleges in France
Nancy, France
EEIGM
Educational institutions established in 1991
1991 establishments in France